Tim Hardin 1 is the debut album by folk artist Tim Hardin, released in 1966 on Verve Records.

History
Tim Hardin 1 contains one of his most well-known and frequently covered songs, "Reason to Believe"a notable hit for Rod Stewart in 1971. Some of the songs were demos that ended up on the final release. After principal recording was completed, string arrangements was overdubbed onto some of the tracks without Hardin's consent. Hardin said he was so upset that he cried when he first heard the recordings.

The album photography was shot by Lisa Law (credited as Lisa Bachelis) in the garden of her home, which was known as "The Castle" and where Bob Dylan was staying at the time. One of the outtakes of this shoot was used for the retrospective, Hang on a to a Dream: The Verve Recordings.

Tim Hardin 1 was re-released on CD in 1998 by Repertoire along with Tim Hardin 2.

It was voted number 711 in the third edition of Colin Larkin's All Time Top 1000 Albums (2000).

Reception

Allmusic stated in their review: "Tim Hardin 1 is one of the most powerful and compelling records of its era... The result is a seminal folk-rock album, every bit as exciting and urgent as it was in 1966, and as important a creative effort as Bob Dylan's Bringing It All Back Home and Highway 61 Revisited. And this wasn't even Hardin's best album, though it set the pattern for everything he did after."

Track listing
All songs written by Tim Hardin; except where noted
Side one
"Don't Make Promises" – 2:26
"Green Rocky Road" (Traditional, with lyrics by Len Chandler and Robert Kaufman) - 2:18
"Smugglin' Man" – 1:57
"How Long" – 2:54
"While You're On Your Way" – 2:17
"It'll Never Happen Again" – 2:37

Side two
"Reason to Believe" – 2:00
"Never Too Far" – 2:16
"Part of the Wind" – 2:19
"Ain't Gonna Do Without" – 2:13
"Misty Roses" – 2:00
"How Can We Hang On to a Dream" – 2:04

Personnel
Tim Hardin – vocals, guitar, keyboards
Gary Burton – vibraphone
Bob Bushnell – bass
Earl Palmer – drums
Buddy Saltzman – drums
Jon Wilcox – drums
John Sebastian – harmonica
Phil Kraus – background vocals
Walter Yost – bass
Artie Butler – string arrangements
Technical
Val Valentin - engineer
Lisa Bachelis - photography

References 

1966 debut albums
Tim Hardin albums
Verve Forecast Records albums
Albums produced by Erik Jacobsen